Roamin' with Richardson is an album by saxophonist Jerome Richardson recorded in 1959 and released on the New Jazz label.

Reception

Scott Yanow of AllMusic states, "Richardson plays baritone on three songs (in a deep tone a little reminiscent of Pepper Adams and Leo Parker), two on tenor and one on flute ... in excellent form, swinging through three group originals, 'I Never Knew', 'Poinciana' and a strong version (on baritone) of Duke Ellington's 'Warm Valley'."

Track listing 
 "Friar Tuck" (George Tucker) – 5:36
 "Up at Teddy's Hill" (Jerome Richardson) – 6:20
 "Warm Valley" (Duke Ellington) – 8:40
 "Poinciana" (Nat Simon, Buddy Bernier) – 7:33	
 "I Never Knew" (Ted Fio Rito, Gus Kahn) – 6:38
 "Candied Sweets" (Richard Wyands) – 4:25

Personnel 
Jerome Richardson – tenor saxophone, baritone saxophone, flute
Richard Wyands – piano
George Tucker – bass
Charlie Persip – drums

References 

Jerome Richardson albums
1959 albums
Albums recorded at Van Gelder Studio
New Jazz Records albums
Albums produced by Esmond Edwards